Julianna Allan was an Australian actress. She played an Aboriginal girl in Wandjina! (1966).

Select Credits
Silver Wedding (1958) - radio
Flash Point (1959) - radio
Return Journey (1960) - stage play
Orphan Girl (1961) - stage play, Genesians
The Story of Peter Gray (1962) - TV series
Consider Your Verdict - "Queen Versus Bent" (1962) - about an aboriginal stockman played by Harold Blair
Jonah (1962) - TV series
Split Level (1964) - TV play
Wandjina! (1966) - TV series
Homicide - "Freakout " (1967) 
Hunter (1967) - "Singapore"
Vega 4 (1968) - TV series
Division 4 "Where's Lefty " (1970)
Matlock Police - "They'll Fix You Up, No Worries  " (1974) 
Aboriginal legends (1974) - narrator
Special Squad - "Easy Street " (1984)

References

External links
Julianna Allan at IMDb

Australian actors